Reizo Ohira (born 7 March 1935) is a Japanese basketball player. He competed in the men's tournament at the 1956 Summer Olympics.

References

1935 births
Living people
Japanese men's basketball players
Olympic basketball players of Japan
Basketball players at the 1956 Summer Olympics
Place of birth missing (living people)